Annet may refer to:

Arts and media
 Lord Thomas and Fair Annet, an English folk ballad
 Anett Futatabi, a 1993 video game
 Aldri annet enn bråk,  a 1954 Norwegian film

People
 Armand Annet
 Peter Annet
 Annet (given name), including a list of people with the given name

Places
 Annet, Isles of Scilly, UK
 Annet-sur-Marne, France